In Greek mythology, the name Apheidas (Ancient Greek: Ἀφείδας or Ἀφείδαντα) may refer to:

Apheidas, son of Arcas
Apheidas, a Centaur who attended the wedding of Pirithous and Hippodamia.
Apheidas, son of Polypemon, from Alybas. Odysseus at first introduces himself as Eperitus, son of this Apheidas, when he comes to see Laertes after having done away with the suitors of Penelope.
Apheidas, one of the comrades of the Greek hero Odysseus. When the latter and 12 of his crew came into the port of Sicily, the Cyclops Polyphemus seized and confined them. The monster then slain Apheidas and five others namely: Antiphon, Euryleon, Kepheus, Stratios and Menetos, while the remaining six survived.
Apheidas (king of Athens), son of Oxyntes. After a short reign of one year, his brother Thymoetes succeeded him on the throne.
Apheidas, a king after whom a part of Molossians were named Apheidantes.

Notes

References 

 Apollodorus, The Library with an English Translation by Sir James George Frazer, F.B.A., F.R.S. in 2 Volumes, Cambridge, MA, Harvard University Press; London, William Heinemann Ltd. 1921. ISBN 0-674-99135-4. Online version at the Perseus Digital Library. Greek text available from the same website.
Athenaeus of Naucratis, The Deipnosophists or Banquet of the Learned. London. Henry G. Bohn, York Street, Covent Garden. 1854. Online version at the Perseus Digital Library.
 Athenaeus of Naucratis, Deipnosophistae. Kaibel. In Aedibus B.G. Teubneri. Lipsiae. 1887. Greek text available at the Perseus Digital Library.
 Homer, The Odyssey with an English Translation by A.T. Murray, PH.D. in two volumes. Cambridge, MA., Harvard University Press; London, William Heinemann, Ltd. 1919. . Online version at the Perseus Digital Library. Greek text available from the same website.
 Publius Ovidius Naso, Metamorphoses translated by Brookes More (1859-1942). Boston, Cornhill Publishing Co. 1922. Online version at the Perseus Digital Library.
 Publius Ovidius Naso, Metamorphoses. Hugo Magnus. Gotha (Germany). Friedr. Andr. Perthes. 1892. Latin text available at the Perseus Digital Library.
 Stephanus of Byzantium, Stephani Byzantii Ethnicorum quae supersunt, edited by August Meineike (1790-1870), published 1849. A few entries from this important ancient handbook of place names have been translated by Brady Kiesling. Online version at the Topos Text Project.
Tzetzes, John, Allegories of the Odyssey translated by Goldwyn, Adam J. and Kokkini, Dimitra. Dumbarton Oaks Medieval Library, Harvard University Press, 2015. 

Centaurs
Characters in the Odyssey
Kings of Athens
Kings in Greek mythology
Attican characters in Greek mythology